Neritopsis aqabaensis is a species of sea snail, a marine gastropod mollusk in the family Neritopsidae.

Description
The veliger is planktotrophic.

Distribution
Gulf of Aqaba, Jordan.

References

Neritopsidae
Gastropods described in 2007